Ernest Alfred Benians (23 October 1880, Goudhurst, Kent – February 1952) was a British academic and historian.

He was born in Goudhurst, Kent, and was educated at Bethany School, where his father was headmaster. He went to the University of Cambridge in 1899, where he was admitted to St John's College, and became President of the Nonconformist Union. After graduating, he became a Fellow of St John's in 1906, followed by a succession of teaching appointments within the university. He was Master of St John's 1933–1952 and Vice-Chancellor of the University of Cambridge 1939–1941. In 1947 he was elected an honorary fellow of Trinity College Dublin.

Selected publications
The Cambridge History of the British Empire. General editor.

References and sources
References

Sources
 Janus Catalogue (biographical notes)

External links
 

Masters of St John's College, Cambridge
1880 births
1952 deaths
Alumni of St John's College, Cambridge
Honorary Fellows of Trinity College Dublin
Vice-Chancellors of the University of Cambridge
20th-century English historians
People educated at Bethany School, Goudhurst